Itihaas may refer to:

 Itihasa, historical portions of the Brāhmaṇas
 Indian epic poetry
 Itihaas (1987 film), a 1987 Indian film
 Itihaas (TV series), a TV series by Balaji Telefilms (1996–1997)
 Itihaas (1997 film), a 1997 India film
 Itihas (film), a 2002 Bangladeshi film
 Ithihasa, 2014 Indian film
 Itihāsa (manga), manga series by Wakako MIzuki